Amakan, also known as sawali in the northern Philippines, is a type of traditional woven split-bamboo mats used as walls, paneling, or wall cladding in the Philippines. They are woven into various intricate traditional patterns, often resulting in repeating diagonal, zigzag, or diamond-like shapes. The term "sawali" is more properly defined as twilled weaving patterns. The term can also be applied to baskets and banig (soft woven mats made from pandan leaves, buri palm straw, abaca, or sedges), which also use the same weaving patterns. Amakan panels are commonly confused with nipa walls, which are made from thatched leaves.

Amakan are used as walls in the traditional nipa huts (bahay kubo) of the Philippines. They are lightweight and are porous, allowing air circulation to keep buildings cool in the hot tropical climate. The porosity also balances pressure inside the house during strong winds, minimizing roof damage. Amakan needs to be treated before installation. They are soaked in seawater, dried, and then usually (but not always) varnished. They are usually affixed to a wooden framework, then battened with bamboo or coco lumber.

Amakan is associated with lower income rural housing because it is inexpensive and easy to replace. It is not uncommon for amakan to also be used as a design element (usually as cladding or paneling) in modern Filipino architecture to portray a rustic, traditional and tropical aesthetic. It also ecologically sustainable because it is made with bamboo.

See also
Banig
 Rattan

References

Vernacular architecture
Philippine handicrafts